In combat sports such as boxing, kickboxing and mixed martial arts, a fighter's chin is the figurative ability to tolerate physical trauma to the chin or jaw without being knocked unconscious. The fictional Rocky Balboa character of the Rocky franchise epitomizes the concept of a boxer with a granite chin.

Overview
A fighter with a "good chin" refers to a fighter with the ability to absorb blows to the chin or jaw without being struck unconscious, which can also be called a "granite chin", an "iron chin" or similar. Generally, the jaw portion of the skull, and specifically the point of the chin, is the area most vulnerable to a knock-out blow and therefore having an exceptional tolerance to punishment in this area is a great advantage to a fighter.

A "bad chin", "suspect chin", or "glass jaw" refers to fighters with limited ability to absorb punishment to the chin or jaw. Some boxing experts, such as Teddy Atlas, believe it to be a mindset.

The "chin" of a fighter is widely considered genetic, but is affected by the amount of blows the fighter takes throughout his/her career. Many instances of athletes with a 'good chin' have ended in the athlete relying too much on the attribute, thus slowly building up brain damage. Brain damage affects the brain's ability to recover from trauma, weakening the person’s ability to take a punch.

Certain factors are speculated to be the size and shape of the skull, strength of the neck as well as overall strength and weight. Other factors could be less visible, such as the brain being more efficient at replenishing the electrolyte balance after trauma, or more cerebrospinal fluid to protect the brain.

A fighter's chin could be affected by weight cutting (excessive water weight loss, malnutrition), or repeated blows to the head that cause brain damage (Chronic traumatic encephalopathy).

Notable chins

Some of the people who have strong chins in different sports are listed below:

Boxing

 Muhammad Ali 
 Canelo Álvarez
 Henry Armstrong
 Carmen Basilio
 James J. Braddock
 Christy Martin
 Randall "Tex" Cobb
 Chris Eubank 
 Tommy Farr
 George Foreman

Kickboxing

 Remy Bonjasky
 Francois Botha
 Choi Hong-man
 Francisco Filho
 Daniel Ghiţă

Pro wrestling
 Mick Foley
 The Undertaker

Mixed martial arts

 Marvin Vettori
 Chris Lytle
 Ian McCall
 Jorge Masvidal
 Cain Velasquez
 Conor McGregor
 Stipe Miocic
 Tai Tuivasa
 Daniel Cormier

See Also
Knockout

References

Boxing terminology
Kickboxing terminology
Martial arts terminology